Raveena Desraj Shrestha is the Acting Chief Executive Officer of Mega Bank Nepal. She was elected as the vice-chairman of Women Entrepreneur Development Committee appointed by the (FNCCI).

Shrestha started her career as trainee assistant in Standard Chartered Bank. She joined Mega Bank Nepal Limited as the chief business officer and corporate affairs and is now the DCEO of the bank. Shrestha is a member of Nepal Chamber Of Commerce (NCC) in the Bank, Finance & Insurance Committee. She is the vice-chairman of Women Entrepreneur Development Committee appointed by the Federation of Nepalese Chambers of Commerce and Industry (FNCCI).

Shrestha has won two 21st Century Golden Phoenix Award from Malaysia-based Asia Excellence Entrepreneur Federation one in 2014 and the other in 2015. She also won the Lady of Excellence Award in 2014.

Shrestha had a cameo in a thriller movie, Soul Sister.

References 

Living people
Women bankers
21st-century Nepalese women
Year of birth missing (living people)